Katia Serra (born 5 April 1973 in Bologna, Italy) is an Italian former footballer who played as a midfielder. She later became a television football pundit for Rai Sport.

She played for Bologna (1986–1991), Lugo di Ravenna (1994–1997), Modena (1997–1999), Lazio (2002–2003), Bergamo (2003–2004), Atletico Oristano (2004–2005), Agliana and Terme di Cervia (2005–2006), Reggiana (2006–2007), Trento (2007–2008), Roma (2008–2009) and Levante (2010).

She won an Italian championship with Modena.

She played 20 matches for Italy women's national football team (the first being on 20 March 2002), scoring one goal.

References

External links

 Katia Serra's official site

1973 births
Living people
Footballers from Bologna
Italian women's footballers
Women's association football midfielders
Italy women's international footballers
Serie A (women's football) players
S.S. Lazio Women 2015 players
Primera División (women) players
Levante UD Femenino players
A.S.D. Reggiana Calcio Femminile players
Expatriate women's footballers in Spain
Italian expatriate sportspeople in Spain
Italian expatriate women's footballers
Italian people of Sardinian descent
Roma Calcio Femminile players
Foroni Verona F.C. players